David Hickinbotham (1862 – 9 November 1941) was an Australian rules footballer who played with Geelong in the Victorian Football Association (VFA) and coached them in the Victorian Football League (VFL).

Under Hickinbotham's captaincy, Geelong did not lose a single game in the 1886 VFA season on their way to the premiership. His sides were renowned for their fitness and physical preparation, while as a player he was regarded as one of the best centreman of the 1880s. Hickinbotham became Geelong's inaugural VFL coach in 1910 and was in charge for two seasons. He was particularly remembered for his best-on-ground performance in the famous 1886 "Match of the Century" against .

References

Geelong Football Club (VFA) players
Geelong Football Club coaches
1862 births
1941 deaths
Australian rules footballers from Victoria (Australia)